Callianira hexagona is a species of ctenophore of the family Mertensiidae. The scientific name of this species was first published in 1789 by Bruguière.

References

Tentaculata
Animals described in 1778